In number theory, a Heegner number (as termed by Conway and Guy) is a square-free positive integer d such that the imaginary quadratic field  has class number 1. Equivalently, its ring of integers has unique factorization.

The determination of such numbers is a special case of the class number problem, and they underlie several striking results in number theory.

According to the (Baker–)Stark–Heegner theorem there are precisely nine Heegner numbers:

This result was conjectured by Gauss and proved up to minor flaws by Kurt Heegner in 1952.  Alan Baker and Harold Stark independently proved the result in 1966, and Stark further indicated the gap in Heegner's proof was minor.

Euler's prime-generating polynomial
Euler's prime-generating polynomial

which gives (distinct) primes for n = 0, ..., 39, is related to the Heegner number 163 = 4 · 41 − 1.

Rabinowitz proved that

gives primes for  if and only if this quadratic's discriminant  is the negative of a Heegner number.

(Note that  yields , so  is maximal.)

1, 2, and 3 are not of the required form, so the Heegner numbers that work are 7, 11, 19, 43, 67, 163, yielding prime generating functions of Euler's form for 2, 3, 5, 11, 17, 41; these latter numbers are called lucky numbers of Euler by F. Le Lionnais.

Almost integers and Ramanujan's constant
Ramanujan's constant is the transcendental number
, which is an almost integer, in that it is very close to an integer:

This number was discovered in 1859 by the mathematician Charles Hermite.
In a 1975 April Fool article in Scientific American magazine, "Mathematical Games" columnist Martin Gardner made the hoax claim that the number was in fact an integer, and that the Indian mathematical genius Srinivasa Ramanujan had predicted it—hence its name.

This coincidence is explained by complex multiplication and the q-expansion of the j-invariant.

Detail
Briefly,  is an integer for d a Heegner number, and

via the q-expansion.

Thus if the imaginary quadratic extension  has class number 1 (so d is a Heegner number), the j-invariant is an integer.

The coefficients  asymptotically grow as

Setting  yields

Now

so,

Or,

where the linear term of the error is,

explaining why  is within approximately the above of being an integer.

Pi formulas

The Chudnovsky brothers found in 1987 that

a proof of which uses the fact that

For similar formulas, see the Ramanujan–Sato series.

Other Heegner numbers
For the four largest Heegner numbers, the approximations one obtains are as follows.

Alternatively,

where the reason for the squares is due to certain Eisenstein series.  For Heegner numbers , one does not obtain an almost integer; even  is not noteworthy.  The integer j-invariants are highly factorisable, which follows from the form

and factor as,

These transcendental numbers, in addition to being closely approximated by integers (which are simply algebraic numbers of degree 1), can be closely approximated by algebraic numbers of degree 3,

The roots of the cubics can be exactly given by quotients of the Dedekind eta function η(τ), a modular function involving a 24th root, and which explains the 24 in the approximation. They can also be closely approximated by algebraic numbers of degree 4,

If  denotes the expression within the parenthesis (e.g. ), it satisfies respectively the quartic equations 

Note the reappearance of the integers  as well as the fact that

which, with the appropriate fractional power, are precisely the j-invariants.  

Similarly for algebraic numbers of degree 6,

where the xs are given respectively by the appropriate root of the sextic equations,

with the j-invariants appearing again.  These sextics are not only algebraic, they are also solvable in radicals as they factor into two cubics over the extension  (with the first factoring further into two quadratics). These algebraic approximations can be exactly expressed in terms of Dedekind eta quotients. As an example, let , then,

where the eta quotients are the algebraic numbers given above.

Class 2 numbers
The three numbers 88, 148, 232, for which the imaginary quadratic field  has class number 2, are not considered as Heegner numbers but have certain similar properties in terms of almost integers. For instance, 

and

Consecutive primes

For details, see "Quadratic Polynomials Producing Consecutive Distinct Primes and Class Groups of Complex Quadratic Fields" by Richard Mollin.

Notes and references

External links
 
 
 Gauss' Class Number Problem for Imaginary Quadratic Fields, by Dorian Goldfeld: Detailed history of problem.
 

Algebraic number theory